In Sickness & In Health is the debut album of Welsh psychobilly band Demented Are Go. It was originally released in 1986 on ID Records. The band did two interpretations of early rock 'n' roll songs plus a cover-version of The Osmonds song "Crazy Horses". The two rock 'n' roll songs featured on the album were Gene Vincent's "Be-Bop-A-Lula" and Mack Self's "Vibrate".

Track listing
"Be Bop A Lula" 
"Pervy in the Park" 
"(I Was Born on a) Busted Hymen" 
"Holy Hack Jack" 
"Frenzied Beat" 
"Pickled and Preserved" 
"Crazy Horses" 
"Transvestite Blues" 
"Rubber Buccaneer" 
"Vibrate" 
"Rubber Love" 
"Nuke Mutants" 
"Pvc Chair" 
"Don't Go in the Woods"

Personnel
 Sparky (Mark Phillips) - Vocals, Winger-Wanger
 Ant Thomas - Drums
 Dick - Lead Guitar, Electric Bass, Vocals
 Ray Thompson -Double Bass
 Simon Cohen -Fiddle
Simon Crowfoot -Double Bass on Rubber Love

Production
 Producer: Pete Gage
 Engineers: Malcolm, Pete Gage
 Mastering: 
 CD Mastering: 
 Photography: Tim Wilkins

Demented Are Go albums
1986 debut albums